Alawalpur is a village in the Palwal district, in Haryana State in northern India. It is administered by a sarpanch.

The village has a post office and a branch of the Punjab National Bank.

References

Villages in Palwal district